Hobbs is a women’s clothing, footwear and accessories retailer based in London, UK. It was founded in Hampstead in 1981 and began as a shoe retailer. Hobbs now has stores across the United Kingdom, concession stores in the United States and Germany and franchise stores in Dubai and Sweden. The online store serves 55 countries worldwide. Hobbs is popularly associated with clothing priced in the mid range for a customer base that is largely middle-aged and older.

Origins and history 
Hobbs was established in Hampstead in 1981 by Yoram and Marilyn Anselm, targeting the "average woman between the ages of 20 and 40 interested in clothing". The brand was named after Marilyn’s favourite brand of horsebox.  Having studied sculpture at the Central School of Art and Design, Marilyn states that she began designing her own clothes because she was appalled by the lack of quality clothing available in the early 1970s. Hobbs initially produced shoes, but the clothing line was introduced in 1986, with continued growth of the shoe collection. UK expansion continued, to 34 stores across the UK in 2002. As of January 2020, Hobbs manages 77 stores across the United Kingdom and abroad and operates from a range of department stores, such as Debenhams and John Lewis.

The Hobbs online store was launched in 2008, enabling customers to make purchases from the website. This was expanded to include international customers in 2013 and Hobbs now delivers to 55 countries, with websites serving Australia, Germany and the US.

In 2013 it was rumoured that the company would be sold, after it employed consultants from Price Waterhouse Coopers and began planning a launch of the brand in China. Its owners, 3i, wrote down the value of the company in January 2014. In the financial year 2014-15, Hobbs suffered pre-tax losses of £15.6 million, after acquiring a new chairman and chief executive during 2014. It closed nine outlets during the period.  Hobbs is led by CEO Meg Lustman.

Hobbs in the United States 
Hobbs launched in Bloomingdales in 2014, and there are now 13 concessions across the Bloomingdales network. Hobbs is also available online at Bloomingdales.com. In 2015, the team in the Bloomingdales North Michigan Avenue branch received the Bloomingdales "B the Best" Award, as well as the team in the 59th Street store.

Germany 
Hobbs has a total of four stores in German department stores Wöhrl and SinnLeffers which opened in 2016.

Italian Shoe Factory 
In 1994, the company purchased The Italian Shoe Factory in Porto San Giorgio, a seaside town on the Adriatic coast of Italy traditionally associated with shoe-making. The factory employs 41 artisan shoe makers, and 700 pairs of shoes are made each day in the factory.

Collaborations 
In 2013, Hobbs launched a licensed collection produced in collaboration with the Historic Royal Palaces. Two collections are now designed and produced each year. In 2015 the collection received an Innovation award for the collaboration between Historic Royal Palaces and Hobbs on Collection No.4. Hobbs also works in collaboration with Smart Works; a charity which seeks to help unemployed women to enter the UK workplace by providing interview clothes, styling advice and interview training.

References

External links 
 

Clothing companies based in London
Clothing companies of England
Clothing companies established in 1981
Retail companies established in 1981
Shoe companies of the United Kingdom